Omoglymmius africanus is a species of beetle in the subfamily Rhysodinae. It was described by Grouvelle in 1892.

References

africanus
Beetles described in 1892